The following is a timeline of the history of the city of Anaheim, California, US.

Nineteenth century

 1858 – Settlement named "Annaheim."
 1859 – Anaheim Water Company founded.
 1862 – Flood.
 1869 – Schoolhouse rebuilt.
 1870
 City of Anaheim incorporated.
 Anaheim Gazette newspaper begins publication.
 Anaheim Police Department established.
 Population: 881.
 1871 – City Hall built.
 1875 – Southern Pacific railway begins operating.
 1878 – California Brewery in business.
 1887 – Santa Fe Railroad begins operating.
 1895 – Anaheim Chamber of Commerce established.

Twentieth century
 1902 – Anaheim Public Library established.
 1911 – Anaheim Orange Growers Association incorporated.
 1919
 Anaheim Citrus Packing House built.
 Public park established (approximate date).
 1923 – Anaheim Morning Bulletin begins publication.
 1938 – Los Angeles flood of 1938.
 1941 – Prado Dam built in vicinity of Anaheim.
 1944 – Yorba Orange Growers Association established.
 1955 – Disneyland and Anaheim Drive-In cinema in business.
 1964 – Anaheim Stadium opens.
 1967 – Anaheim Convention Center and the public library's Anaheim History Room open.
 1968 – Fox Cinemaland theatre in business.
 1970 – Population: 166,701.
 1972 – Anaheim Hills Golf Course opens. 
 1974 – Living Stream Ministry relocated to Anaheim (approximate date).
 1976 – Anaheim Historical Society founded.
 1987 – Anaheim Museum established.
 1990 – Population: 266,406.
 1991 – East West Community Church established.
 1992 – Tom Daly becomes mayor.
 1993
 Arrowhead Pond of Anaheim (arena) opens.
 Mighty Ducks ice hockey team formed.
 1994 – South Baylo University relocated to Anaheim.
 1997
 City website online.
 Loretta Sanchez becomes U.S. representative for California's 46th congressional district.
 1998 – Anaheim Transportation Network established.
 2000 – Population: 328,014.

Twenty-first century

 2001 
 Islamic Institute of Orange County built.
 Disney California Adventure opens adjacent to Disneyland. 
 2002 – Curt Pringle becomes mayor.
 2008 
 Anaheim GardenWalk opens to public.
 Garden Walk cinema in business.
 2010
 Tom Tait becomes mayor.
 Population: 336,265; metro 12,828,837.
 2012 – July 21: Anaheim police shooting and protests begin.
 2020 - The COVID-19 Pandemic have reached the city, which have impacted the community, society, economy, and the culture and diversity of this city.

See also
 Anaheim history
 List of mayors of Anaheim, California
 Timelines of other cities in the Southern California area of California: Bakersfield, Long Beach, Los Angeles, Riverside, San Bernardino, San Diego, Santa Ana

References

Bibliography

External links

 
 Items related to Anaheim, various dates (via Digital Public Library of America).

 
anaheim